Bola may refer to:

People
 Bola (name), a surname and given name
 Darrell Fitton, electronic musician from Manchester, England, AKA "Bola" and "Jello"

Geography

 Bola (volcano), a volcano on the island of New Britain in Papua New Guinea
 Bola, Togo
 Tatar spelling of Bula River
 Bolae, an ancient city of Latium, Italy

Sports and games
 Bola bola, a gambling game similar to Three-card Monte 
 Bola (video game), a 2010 Facebook game developed by Playdom
 Bola de Ouro, a Brazilian association football award
 Bola (tabloid), an Indonesian sports newspaper
 Rola bola, a plank on a cylinder on which a person balances

Other uses
 Bolas, throwing weapon made of weights on the ends of an interconnected cord
 Bola tie, or "Bolo tie", a type of necktie consisting of a piece of cord fastened with an ornamental bar or clasp
 Cyclone Bola, a severe 1988 Pacific cyclone
 Bola language (Austronesian), an Oceanic language of West New Britain in Papua New Guinea
 Pela language (Bola language), a Burmish language of Western Yunnan, China

See also
 
 A Bola
 A Bola, Ourense, in Spain
 El Bola
 Battle of Los Angeles (disambiguation) (BOLA)
 Bolas (disambiguation)
 Bolla (disambiguation)
 Bolo (disambiguation)